Anolis sierramaestrae, the Sierra Maestrae bearded anole, is a species of lizard in the family Dactyloidae. The species is found in Cuba.

References

Anoles
Reptiles described in 2012
Endemic fauna of Cuba
Reptiles of Cuba